Fernando Henrique Mariano (born 3 April 1967) is a Brazilian football player.

Club statistics

References

External links

1967 births
Living people
Brazilian footballers
Campeonato Brasileiro Série A players
Campeonato Brasileiro Série B players
J1 League players
Brazilian expatriate footballers
Expatriate footballers in Japan
Esporte Clube Santo André players
Marília Atlético Clube players
Botafogo de Futebol e Regatas players
Esporte Clube Juventude players
Sociedade Esportiva Palmeiras players
Sport Club Internacional players
Guarani FC players
Associação Portuguesa de Desportos players
Mogi Mirim Esporte Clube players
Uberlândia Esporte Clube players
Avispa Fukuoka players
Association football midfielders